The following is a list of Veiled Prophet Parade and Ball themes. The events were formerly held each year in St. Louis, Missouri. Where there is no listing, the theme has not been recorded.

19th Century
1878: Festival of Ceres, an illustrated pageant of the visit of Demeter, Grecian goddess of agriculture, to the Veiled Prophets
1879: Progress of the mechanical arts
1880: The four seasons  
1881: A day-dream in the woodland or Insect life
1882: A panorama of the nations
1883: Fairy Land
1884: Shakespeare's poesy
1885: An Arabian night
1886: American history
1887: Old Testament stories
1888: Child lore
1889: Comic opera
1890: The alphabet
1891: The ten most popular authors
1892: The history of the Upper Louisiana Territory, Missouri and St. Louis
1893: Storied holidays
1894: History of mystic societies in America
1895: The flight of time (the zodiac, days of the week and months of the year
1896: Masterpieces of art
1897: Old-time songs
1899: Visions of childhood
1900: Pageant of the nations

20th Century

1901–1950
1901: Louisiana Purchase
1902: From the Discovery of the Mississippi to the World's Fair
1903: Lyric Opera
 1904: Art and Architecture
1905: Humor
1907: History and Drama
1908: The Seven Ages and the Five Senses
1909: Transportation
1910: Sport
1911: Epochs in the history of the Eighteenth Century
1912: Songs, Poems, and Plays
1913: The Seven Ages and the Five Senses
1914: While We Live, Let Us Live (the European war)
1915: Legends and Myths of All Nations
1916: Shakespeare
1917: Parade canceled.
1918: Parade canceled.
1919: Victory-Peace
1920: Flowers and Plants
1921: Missouri statehood centenary
1922: Dollyana (dolls of the nations)
1923: Romance and Adventure
1924: Jewels and Talismans
1925: Decorations of Honor
1926: Cartoons and Comics
1927: Our Daily Life
1929: Traditions of St. Louis
1930: The Making of a Great Nation
1931: The Romance of Trade and Industry
1932: The Life of George Washington
1933: A Journey Through Bookland
1934: Great Adventurers
1934: Toyland
1936: The Prophet Visits Many Lands
1937: Childhood Memories
1938: Songs We Sing
1939: Gay Nineties
 1940: The Arabian Nights
1941: The Circus
1946: Modes of Travel
1947: Days of the Year
1948: Mother Goose
1949: Once Upon a Time
1950: Old Songs

1951–2000

 1951: Good Neighbors
 1952: The Story of St. Louis
 1953: Years of the Veiled Prophet
 1954: The Veiled Prophet Salutes the Municipal Opera
 1955: What Shall I Be?
 1956: Around the Calendar
 1957: Parade of the Animals
 1958: Great Discoveries and Inventions
 1959: Delights of Childhood
 1960: Folklore and Legends
 1961: Joys of Toys
 1962: Great Adventures
 1963: Songs We Sing
 1964: St. Louis History
1965: Stories and Scenes From the Past
 1966: Sports
 1967: A Salute to the Wonderful Worlds of Walt Disney
 1968: Music for Everyone
 1969: The New Spirit of St. Louis (and) From the Lone Eagle to the lunar eagle
 1970: St. Louis Is a Great Place to Live
 1972: Happiness Is . . .
 1973: You Are There
 1974: If Aladdin's Magic Lamp Were Mine
1975: These Are a Few of My Favorite Things
1976: A Salute to America
1977: The Veiled Prophet — 100 Years in St. Louis
1978 The Wonderful World of Children
1979: That's Entertainment
 1980: Holidays
 1981: Nostalgia in General and the St. Louis World's Fair of 1904 in Particular
 1982: Heritage of St. Louis
 1983: St. Louis — Great Moments in Fantasy
 1984: When You Wish Upon a Star
 1985: A History of Fun
 1986: America the Beautiful
 1987: We the People Sing
 1988: These Are a Few of My Favorite Things, a repetition from 1975
 1989: School Days
 1990: Celebrations
 1991: Through the Eyes of a Child
 1992: A Child's Library
 1993: Great Adventures
 1994: A Festival of Fun and Games
 1995: Beauty of Nature
 1996: Once Upon a Time
 1998: Let the Good Times Roll
 1999: Parade Through Time
 2000: Getting There Is Half the Fun

21st Century

 2001: 2001: A Sports Odyssey

 2002: 125 Years of Paradise

 2003: The World Is Our Playground

 2005: A Salute to Volunteers

 2011: A Night Out

 2016: Hats Off to Heroes

 2017: Great Things Are Happening

 2019: We the People

See also

 List of Rose Parade themes
 Invitations to the Veiled Prophet Ball
List of Veiled Prophet Belles and Queens

References

History of St. Louis